Kuch Apne Kuch Paraye is an Indian television series that aired on Sahara One in 2006, based on the concept of whether a daughter-in-law ever become the daughter of the house. The story traces a young woman named Krishna's life and her struggle for acceptance as the daughter of her in-laws' family. The series aired weekdays at 10:30pm

Plot
The story is of a prominent and conservative business tycoon Vijaypath Raichand — father of seven children and a strict disciplinarian by nature. The show revolves around his daughter-in-law Krishna, married to his second son Abhay who leaves her and the house without stating any reasons. Ego clashes and disputes within the family see Raichand’s children leaving him one by one. Krishna’s sole aim is to bring her family back together as she loves Vijaypath Raichand unconditionally. He, in turn, perceives her as his own daughter. When she is accepted by Raichand this way, the women of the family loathe this fact thereby maintaining constant angst against her. Will the other family members accept her as their daughter?

Cast
 Gunjan Walia as Krishna Abhay Raichand
 Vikram Gokhale as Vijaypath (VP) Raichand 
 Ankur Nayyar as Yuvraj (Yuvi) Raichand 
 Chaitanya Choudhury as Uday Raichand
 Puneet Sachdev as Kabir Raichand
 Tarun Khanna as Aditya Raichand
 Sachin Tyagi as Yash Raichand  
 Rakshanda Khan as Tara Yash Raichand
 Diwakar Pundir as Abhay Raichand
 Madhuri Bhatia as Maya Raichand (Bua) - Vijaypath's Sister

External links
Kuch Apne Kuch Paraye official site

Sahara One original programming
Indian television series
Indian television soap operas
Indian drama television series
2006 Indian television series debuts
2007 Indian television series endings